Semirom County is in Isfahan province, Iran. The capital of the county is the city of Semirom. At the 2006 census, the county's population was 70,735 in 17,072 households. The following census in 2011 counted 65,047 people in 18,062 households. At the 2016 census, the county's population was 74,109 in 22,530 households.

Administrative divisions

The population history and structural changes of Semirom County's administrative divisions over three consecutive censuses are shown in the following table. The latest census shows four districts, eight rural districts, and four cities.

References

 

Counties of Isfahan Province